OxT is a Japanese musical group signed to Pony Canyon and Kadokawa. It consists of vocalist/guitarist Masayoshi Ōishi and guitarist ,  known professionally as Tom Hack (stylized as Tom-H@ck). The unit debuted in 2013, after the two had previously collaborated for the anime television series Ace of Diamond. Their music has also been featured in series such as Overlord, Prince of Stride, Hand Shakers, SSSS.Gridman and The Eminence in Shadow.

History

Ōishi and Tom Hack first collaborated in 2013, when they worked on the song "Go Exceed", which was used as the first opening theme to the anime television series Ace of Diamond. They would collaborate again the following year with the song "Perfect Hero", which was used as the second opening theme to Ace of Diamond. Both songs were credited as "Tom Hack featuring Masayoshi Ōishi".

In 2015, Ōishi and Tom Hack formed the group OxT; the group's name is pronounced "okuto" in Japanese. OxT's first release was the single "Kimero!!" which came out on May 20, 2015; the title track is used as the second ending theme to the second season of Ace of Diamond. Their second single "Clattanoia" was released on August 26, 2015; its title track was used as the opening theme to the anime series Overlord. Their third single "Bloom of Youth" was released on November 11, 2015; the title track is used as the second ending theme to the second season of Ace of Diamond. Their fourth single "Strider's High" was released on February 3, 2016; its title track is used as the opening theme to the anime series Prince of Stride. They released a collection of their songs used in Ace of Diamond on March 2, 2016.

In January 2017, OxT released the CD "Be The Best! Be The Blue!/Tears of a Genius" which were used in a stage play adaptation of Ace of Diamond. This was followed by the release of their fifth single "One Hand Message" on January 25, 2017; the title track is used as the opening theme to the anime series Hand Shakers. Their next release was their sixth single "Number One" which came out on January 17, 2018; the title track was used in the Ace of Diamond stage play.

OxT's seventh single "Go Cry Go" was released on January 24, 2018; the title track is used as the opening theme to the second season of Overlord. This was followed by the release of their eighth single "Silent Solitude" on August 8, 2018; the title track is used as the ending theme to the third season of Overlord. They released their first album Hello New World on September 23, 2018. Their ninth single "Union" was released on November 7, 2018; the title track is used as the opening to the anime series SSSS.Gridman. They released their 10th single "Golden After School" on April 17, 2019; the title track is used as the ending theme to the anime series Ace of Diamond: Act II.
On February 5, 2020, the band released their 11th single "Everlasting Dream", the title track was used as the fourth ending theme to the anime series Ace of Diamond: Act II.
In May 2022, it was announced that the band will perform the opening theme to the anime series Overlord season 4. Their 12th single "Hollow Hunger" was released on July 27, 2022.
In August 2022, it was announced that the band will perform the opening theme to the anime series The Eminence in Shadow. Their 13th single "Highest" was released on October 26, 2022.

Discography

Albums

Singles

See also
Myth & Roid – another musical group with Tom-H@ck as a member.

References

External links
Official website 

2015 establishments in Japan
Anime musical groups
Musical groups established in 2015
Japanese musical groups
Japanese rock music groups
Pony Canyon artists